The 2009–10 Biathlon World Cup was a multi-race tournament over a season of biathlon, organised by the International Biathlon Union. The season started 2 December 2009 in Östersund, Sweden and ended 28 March 2010 with the  Mixed Relay World Championships in Khanty-Mansiysk, Russia. Races of the season were broadcast in Europe on Eurosport channel.

Calendar
Below is the World Cup calendar for the 2009–10 season.

World Cup podiums

Men

Women

Men's team

Women's team

Mixed

Standings: Men

Overall 

Final standings after 25 races.

Individual 

Final standings after 4 races.

Sprint 

Final standings after 10 races.

Pursuit 

Final standings after 6 races.

Mass start 

Final standings after 5 races.

Relay 

Final standings after 5 races.

Nation 

Final standings after 19 races.

Standings: Women

Overall 

Final standings after 25 races.

Individual 

Final standings after 4 races.

Sprint 

Final standings after 10 races.

Pursuit 

Final standings after 6 races.

Mass start 

Final standings after 5 races.

Relay 

Final standings after 5 races.

Nation 

Final standings after 19 races.

Medal table
(includes medals of the Olympic Winter Games Vancouver 2010)

Achievements
First World Cup career victory
, 24, in his 2nd season — the WC 3 Pursuit in Pokljuka; first podium was 2009–10 Sprint in Hochfilzen
, 26, in his 7th season — the WC 6 Individual in Antholz; first podium was 2007–08 Individual in Pokljuka
, 25, in her 4th season — the 2010 Winter Olympics Sprint; first podium was 2009 World Championships Mass start in Pyeongchang
, 23, in her 4th season — the WC 7 Sprint in Kontiolahti; first podium was 2008–09 Sprint in Ruhpolding
, 21, in his 3rd season — the WC 7 Pursuit in Kontiolahti; first podium was 2010 Winter Olympics Mass start in Vancouver
, 26, in her 3rd season — the WC 9 Sprint in Khanty-Mansiysk; it also was her first podium

First World Cup podium
, 27, in his 7th season — no. 2 in the WC 1 Individual in Östersund
, 24, in his 2nd season — no. 3 in the WC 2 Sprint in Hochfilzen
, 29, in his 3rd season — no. 3 in the WC 3 Sprint in Pokljuka
, 31, in his 12th season — no. 2 in the WC 3 Pursuit in Pokljuka
, 27, in her 7th season — no. 3 in the WC 4 Sprint in Oberhof
, 23, in his 3rd season — no. 3 in the WC 6 Individual in Antholz
, 29, in her 5th season — no. 2 in the 2010 Winter Olympics Individual
, 29, in his 10th season — no. 2 in the 2010 Winter Olympics Individual
, 21, in his 3rd season — no. 2 in the 2010 Winter Olympics Mass start
, 29, in his 7th season — no. 2 in the  WC 7 Pursuit in Kontiolahti
, 21, in his 2nd season — no. 2 in the WC 8 Pursuit in Oslo
, 26, in her 3rd season — no. 1 in the WC 9 Sprint in Khanty-Mansiysk

Victory in this World Cup (all-time number of victories in parentheses)

Men
 , 5 (16) first places
 , 4 (7) first places
 , 3 (91) first places
 , 3 (3) first places
 , 3 (3) first places
 , 1 (5) first place
 , 1 (3) first place
 , 1 (2) first place
 , 1 (2) first place
 , 1 (2) first place
 , 1 (2) first place
 , 1 (1) first place

Women
 , 5 (19) first places
 , 4 (9) first places
 , 4 (7) first places
 , 2 (18) first places
 , 2 (11) first places
 , 2 (6) first places
 , 2 (6) first places
 , 2 (2) first places
 , 1 (1) first place
 , 1 (1) first place

Retirements
Following notable biathletes announced their retirement during or after the 2009–10 season:

 

 
 
 

(comeback in 2012/2013 season)

Notes
Yellow mark means the leader in the overall standings, one will wear the yellow jersey in the next World Cup race. Red mark means the leader in the discipline, one will wear the red jersey during the next World Cup race in the discipline, unless the athlete is at the same time the leader in the overall standings, in which case one will wear combined yellow/read jersey.

References

External links
IBU official site

 
Biathlon World Cup
World Cup
World Cup